The Hammadid Capture of Fez occurred in 1062.

Background
Buluggin ibn Muhammad had just coordinated a campaign in Biskra where he restored Hammadid authority.

Capture
Buluggin decided to lead an expedition against Fez, which was under the control of local Maghrawa (Zenata) rulers. Buluggin marched against the Almoravids, repelled them and then captured Fez.

Aftermath
Buluggin spent several months in Fez before leaving, taking with him some of the inhabitants of the city as captives. His paternal cousin Nasir ibn Alnas, who wished to avenge the death of his sister, took the opportunity to assassinate Buluggin during his return journey and then succeeded him as Hammadid ruler. Fez returned afterwards to the control of local Maghrawa, until it was besieged by the Almoravids for many years during the 1060s and eventually fell to them in 1069–70.

References

1062
Hammadids
Medieval Algeria
Fez, Morocco